The 2019 Nigerian Senate election in Kaduna State held on February 23, 2019, to elect members of the Nigerian Senate to represent Kaduna State. Kwari Suleiman Abdu representing Kaduna North, Sani Uba representing Kaduna Central both won on the platform of All Progressives Congress. while Laah Danjuma Tella representing Kaduna South returned to parliament on the platform of People's Democratic Party

Overview

Summary

Results

Kaduna Central 
A total of 24 candidates registered with the Independent National Electoral Commission to contest in the election. APC candidate Sani Uba won the election, defeating PDP candidate Usman Lawal Adamu and 22 other party candidates. Sani received 55.78% of the votes, while Usman Adamu received 30.70%

Kaduna North 
A total of 20 candidates registered with the Independent National Electoral Commission to contest in the election. APC candidate Kwari Suleiman Abdu won the election, defeating PDP candidate Hunkuyi Othman Suleiman and 28 other party candidates. Kwari received 67.68% of the votes, while Hunkuyi received 29.93%

Kaduna South 
A total of 12 candidates registered with the Independent National Electoral Commission to contest in the election. PDP candidate Laah Danjuma Tella won the election, defeating APC candidate Bala Barnabas Yusuf and 10 other party candidates. Laah received 64.35% of the votes, while Barnabas received 31.89%

References 

Kaduna State senatorial elections
Kaduna State Senate elections